Charles Fitzsimmons (1802—1876) was an Irish-born politician and sugar farmer in Queensland, Australia. He was a Member of the Queensland Legislative Assembly.

Early life
Charles Fitzsimmons was born in 1802 in County Cavan, Ireland, the son of James Fitzsimmons and his wife Margaret (née Lynch).

Politics
Fitzsimmons was elected as Member for Port Curtis in the Queensland Legislative Assembly at the inaugural colonial election on 4 May 1860. He held that seat until he resigned on 3 September 1861; Alfred Sandeman won the resulting by-election on 15 October 1861.

Under the Additional Members Act 1864, the seats of Clermont, Kennedy, Maryborough, Mitchell, Rockhampton and Warrego were created. By-elections were held to fill the new seats on 18 March 1865. Fitzsimmons was elected in Rockhampton. He held the seat until the 1867 election on 27 June at which he did not contest the seat, saying he desired to retire from public life. However, he did contest the seat of electoral district of Clermont in the same election, and it was speculated that he had been pressured to stand aside in Rockhampton to allow Archibald Archer to be elected there. However, Thomas Henry Fitzgerald won the election in Rockhampton, but resigned immediately as he wanted to contest the electoral district of Kennedy instead. Archer won the resulting by-election in Rockhampton on 27 July 1867 unopposed.

Fitzsimmons won the election in Clermont on 1 July 1867 and represented that seat until he resigned on 11 May 1868.

Later life
Fitzsimmons died on 24 February 1876 at Nebia Plantation, Mackay, Queensland, following several weeks of prostration due to old age.

See also
 Members of the Queensland Legislative Assembly, 1860–1863
 Members of the Queensland Legislative Assembly, 1863–1867
 Members of the Queensland Legislative Assembly, 1867–1868

References

Members of the Queensland Legislative Assembly
1802 births
1876 deaths
19th-century Australian politicians